Ploshchad Alexandra Nevskogo I is a station on the Nevsko–Vasileostrovskaya Line of Saint Petersburg Metro, opened on November 3, 1967.

External links

Saint Petersburg Metro stations
Railway stations in Russia opened in 1967
Railway stations located underground in Russia